The 2019 U-19 Asia Rugby Championship is an international rugby union competition for Under 20 national teams in Asia. The winners in Asia Rugby U19 Championship secured a berth at the 2020 World Rugby Under 20 Trophy.

Top division
The top division was held in Kaohsiung, Taiwan from 8–14 December 2019 in a round-robin tournament format.

Table

Matches

All times are local (UTC+8).

Round 1

Round 2

Round 3

See also
 List of sporting events in Taiwan

References

Asia Rugby Championship
Asia Rugby Championship
Asia Rugby Championship
Asia Rugby Championship